The 2019 Challenger Ciudad de Guayaquil was a professional tennis tournament played on clay courts. It was the fifteenth edition of the tournament which was part of the 2019 ATP Challenger Tour. It took place in Guayaquil, Ecuador between October 28 and November 3, 2019.

Singles main-draw entrants

Seeds

 1 Rankings are as of 21 October 2019.

Other entrants
The following players received wildcards into the singles main draw:
  Hugo Dellien
  Facundo Díaz Acosta
  Alejandro González
  Antonio Cayetano March
  Alexander Zederbauer

The following player received entry into the singles main draw as an alternate:
  Wilson Leite

The following players received entry from the qualifying draw:
  Mauricio Echazú
  Rafael Matos

The following player received entry as a lucky loser:
  Federico Zeballos

Champions

Singles

 Thiago Seyboth Wild def.  Hugo Dellien 6–4, 6–0.

Doubles

 Ariel Behar /  Gonzalo Escobar def.  Pedro Sakamoto /  Thiago Seyboth Wild 7–6(7–4), 7–6(7–5).

References

2019 ATP Challenger Tour
2019
2019 in Ecuadorian sport
October 2019 sports events in South America
November 2019 sports events in South America